Durga Mandir  may refer to the following temples in India:
 Durga temple, Aihole, Karnataka
 Durga Temple, Baideshwar, Orissa
 Durga Temple, Motia, Orissa
 Durga Mandir, Ramnagar, Uttar Pradesh
 Durga Mandir, Varanasi, Uttar Pradesh